

Liane may refer to:

People

Given name 
 Liane Augustin (1927–1978), German Austrian actress and singer
 Liane Bahler (1982–2007), German racing cyclist
 Liane Balaban (born 1980), Canadian actress
 Liane Berkowitz (1923–1943), German World War II resistance member 
 Liane Bonin, American journalist, author and radio producer
 Liane Carroll (born 1964), English pianist/vocalist
 Liane Engeman, Dutch racing car driver
 Liane Gabora, Canadian academic and psychologist
 Liane Haid (1895-2021), Austrian actress
 Liane Hansen (born 1951), American National Public Radio host
 Liane Michaelis (born 1953), East German handball player
 Liane de Pougy (1869–1950), French dancer and courtesan
Liane Marcia Rossi, Brazilian chemist
 Liane Tooth (born 1962), Australian field hockey player

Surname 
 Eigil Olaf Liane (1916–1994), Norwegian politician

Fictional characters 
 Liane Cartman, character from the television series South Park
 Liane the Wayfarer, a character in the Dying Earth series by Jack Vance

Places 
 Liane (river), in northern France

See also 
 Lianne
 Liana (disambiguation)

German feminine given names